Mentai Waido is the name of a long-running local-interest television programme shown on FBS (Fukuoka Broadcasting Corporation) in Fukuoka, Japan. The show is broadcast weekdays, from about 3pm until about 7pm, and consists of interviews with local people, introductions of local restaurants and attractions, and topical news segments. The programme has a light-hearted approach.

Japanese television series